Sergio Bertoni (23 September 1915 – 15 February 1995) was an Italian association football manager and player, who played as a striker. With the Italy national team, he won the 1936 Summer Olympics football tournament and the 1938 FIFA World Cup.

Club career
Born in Pisa, Bertoni played for Pisa Calcio (1935–1938) and Genoa C.F.C. (1938–1946) throughout his club career.

International career
Bertoni obtained six international caps with the Italy national team between 1936 and 1940, and scored one goal. He won the gold medal at the 1936 Summer Olympics and the 1938 FIFA World Cup: with Alfredo Foni, Pietro Rava and Ugo Locatelli, he is one of the only four Italian players to have won both tournaments.

Managerial career and later life
After World War II, Bertoni coached Spezia Calcio 1906 in the 1950–51, 1955–56, 1956–57 and 1961–62  seasons. He died at 79 years old.

Honours

International 
Italy
Olympic Gold Medal: 1936
FIFA World Cup: 1938

References

External links
profile

1915 births
1995 deaths
Sportspeople from the Province of Pisa
Italian footballers
Italy international footballers
Association football forwards
Pisa S.C. players
Genoa C.F.C. players
Olympic footballers of Italy
Olympic gold medalists for Italy
Footballers at the 1936 Summer Olympics
1938 FIFA World Cup players
FIFA World Cup-winning players
Italian football managers
Spezia Calcio managers
Olympic medalists in football
Medalists at the 1936 Summer Olympics
Footballers from Tuscany